Ghost Train is a children's television programme broadcast on ITV, from 1 April 1989 to 24 August 1991.

Storyline
The series concept involved presenter Frances Dodge inheriting a ghost train from her grandmother. With the help of fellow presenters Paul J Medford and Sabra Williams, she sneaks the train from the grasp of the evil Barry Mafia (Joe Hall) and makes her escape. Inside is a startled Gerard (Angelo Abela), the aliens' favourite broadcaster, and a camp sounding talking sheep, named Nobby (a puppet operated and voiced by Simon Buckley). However Barry Mafia is after them, aided by the Mafiaettes.

As Barry hatched several schemes to get his hands on the Ghost Train, the trio of friends used the train as a platform for special guests, live performances from pop music artists, and introduced various cartoons including Scooby-Doo, The Real Ghostbusters and The Trap Door. At the end of series two, Barry finally regained control of the Train, but would lose it back to Frances in series three. The series ended on a cliffhanger, with the crew exiled to an alien planet.

Sunday spin-off
A spin-off Sunday morning series, Ghost Train on Sunday was produced in 1989 by Border Television and presented by Shauna Lowry.

Transmission guide
Series 1: 22 editions from 1 April 1989 – 26 August 1989
Series 2: 19 editions from 21 April 1990 – 25 August 1990
Series 3: 21 editions from 6 April 1991 – 24 August 1991

External links
 
 Ghost Train on Paul Morris' SatKids

1980s British children's television series
1990s British children's television series
1989 British television series debuts
1991 British television series endings
British television shows featuring puppetry
ITV children's television shows
English-language television shows
Television series by ITV Studios
Television shows produced by Tyne Tees Television
Television shows produced by Border Television
Television shows produced by Ulster Television
Television shows produced by Channel Television
Television shows produced by Television South West (TSW)
Television shows produced by Grampian Television